Zone 91 is a zone of the municipality of Al Wakrah in the state of Qatar. The main districts recorded in the 2015 population census were Al Thumama, Al Wukair, and Al Mashaf. 

Other districts which fall within its administrative boundaries are Abu Sulba, Barwa Al Baraha, Birkat Al Awamer, Muaither Al Wukair, and Wadi Aba Seleel.

Demographics

Land use
The Ministry of Municipality and Environment (MME) breaks down land use in the zone as follows.

References 

Zones of Qatar
Al Wakrah